The Elephantine Colossus (also known as the Colossal Elephant or the Elephant Colossus, or by its function as the Elephant Hotel) was a tourist attraction located on Coney Island in Brooklyn, New York City.  It was built in the shape of an elephant, an example of novelty architecture.  The seven story structure designed by James V. Lafferty stood above Surf Avenue and West 12th Street from 1885 until 1896, when it burnt down in a fire. During its lifespan, the thirty-one room building acted as a concert hall and amusement bazaar.  It was the second of three elephant buildings built by Lafferty, preceded by the extant Lucy the Elephant near Atlantic City and followed by The Light of Asia in Cape May.

Size

Construction was reported to have cost $65,000. Built two years before the Statue of Liberty, it was said to be the first artificial structure visible to immigrants arriving to the United States.

Rooms and attractions
Originally intended to serve as a tourist attraction, the elephant contained novelty stalls, a gallery, a grand hall, and a museum in what would be the elephant's left lung. The elephant's eyes contained telescopes and acted as an observatory for visitors. Its manager claimed to see, from the elephant's back, Yellowstone Park, Rio de Janeiro, and Paris.

As Coney Island became more established as a center of tourism and leisure, the elephant began to serve as a brothel as well.
When the elephant caught fire on September 27, 1896, it had not been used for several years. The property was afterward incorporated into Luna Park, where A Trip to the Moon stood on the site of the former hotel.

In popular culture

The Colossus is featured in Victoria Thompson's 2000 mystery novel Murder on St. Mark's Place, about the murder of several call girls who may have been linked to the hotel.

See also
 Lucy the Elephant, a similar surviving beach attraction elephant in Margate, New Jersey

References

External links
 Shapes of Time on Coney Island, with pictures of the Elephant Hotel.

Coney Island
Hotels in Brooklyn
Entertainment venues in Brooklyn
Defunct hotels in New York City
Novelty buildings in New York (state)
Demolished buildings and structures in Brooklyn
Burned buildings and structures in the United States
Hotel buildings completed in 1885
Buildings and structures demolished in 1896
1885 establishments in New York (state)
1896 disestablishments in New York (state)
Elephants in art